Danforth Brown House, also known as Old Worrell Farm, is a historic home located near Wellsburg, Brooke County, West Virginia. It is a two-story, five bay, brick and frame I house form dwelling in the Italianate style.  The original section was built in 1823, with additions built in the 1870s. It sits on a sandstone foundation.  Also on the property is the original spring house.

It was listed on the National Register of Historic Places in 1992.

References

Houses on the National Register of Historic Places in West Virginia
Italianate architecture in West Virginia
I-houses in West Virginia
Houses completed in 1823
Houses in Brooke County, West Virginia
National Register of Historic Places in Brooke County, West Virginia